Montasser Louhichi (born 4 February 1974) is a Tunisian football manager.

References

1974 births
Living people
Tunisian football managers
AS Gabès managers
Club Athlétique Bizertin managers
Stade Tunisien managers
Club Africain football managers
Tunisian Ligue Professionnelle 1 managers